The John Henry effect is an experimental bias introduced into social experiments by reactive behavior by the control group.

In a controlled social experiment if a control is aware of their status as members of the control group and is able to compare their performance with that of the treatment group, members of the control group may actively work harder to overcome the "disadvantage" of being in the control group.

For example, if in an educational trial where the school classes who are in the treatment receive an extra support teacher, students who are in the control group may be induced to work harder to overcome that disadvantage.

The term was first used by Gary Saretsky (1972) to describe the behavior of  John Henry, a legendary American steel driver in the 1870s who, when he heard his output was being compared with that of a steam drill, worked so hard to outperform the machine that he died in the process.

See also 
 Hawthorne effect
 Reactivity (psychology)
 John Henryism

References

Further reading

Social phenomena
Experimental bias